Scorn is a fictional character in the DC Comics universe. He first appeared in Superman (vol. 2) #122 (April 1997), and for a time was a regular supporting character in the Superman line of comics.

Fictional biography 
Scorns' alter-ego, Ceritak, was born in the Bottle City of Kandor, an extradimensional place populated by a variety of creatures from all over the universe. Most of the inhabitants descended from beings imprisoned in Kandor at some time either by the living computer Brainiac or the magician Tolos who stole the bottle city from Brainiac. The species that Ceritak belongs to is distinguishing itself by its dark-blue skin, stout physique and a set of two horns sprouting from their foreheads. 

Although his father Cerimul served as one of the elite councillors issued by Tolos with the assignment of governing Kandor, Ceritak developed into a rebellious young man as he grew up. Obsessed with escaping from the imprisonment in Kandor, Ceritak seized the opportunity of a transitory disruption in the energy wall separating Kandor's dimension from the dimension outside the city. 

Stranded on earth Ceritak, at first not capable to communicate with the locals, due to some misunderstandings was regarded as a peril and dubbed "Scorn" by the media. After a run-in with Superman, he managed to prove his good nature and benevolent intentions. In time he became a frequent ally of Superman helping him to defeat perils such as Saviour, the Parasite, Cyborg and Deathtrap. On top of that he saved and became friends with Ashbury Armstrong, the daughter of the Daily Planet's conservative columnist Dirk Armstrong, who observed the relationship with much concern and chagrin. Ceritak, Ashbury and Jimmy Olsen escaped from a halloween party organized by Lex Luthor and with the sorceress Misa for a while formed a group of young adventurers (reminiscent of the Forever People) travelling the Wild Area outside of Metropolis with a futuristic vehicle and one time helping the Teen Titans. Eventually Scorn was captured by a group of mercenaries working on behalf of Lex Luthor. Overseen by Luthor (appearing in hologram-form and under the guise of one 'Gustav Milan') they start experimenting on him in order to learn the whereabouts of Kandor. After Jimmy and Misa had been searching for Scorn for a while to no avail Ashbury started to look for him alone only to end up as a prisoner herself. Soon thereafter Misa and Jimmy managed to localise the two of them and - aided by a strange little blue creature (later identified as a 'Fuzzlet', a creation of the Project Cadmus) - enabled them to escape just before Luthor blew up the barn where the makeshift-prison was accommodated, killing his henchmen in the process.

Shortly thereafter Scorn and Ashbury helped Superman Red to fight dinosaurs who wound up in Metropolis due to time anomalies.

Later on Scorn and Ashbury accompanied Superman on a trip to Kandor, once again fighting the Cyborg who was trying to take over the Bottle City and finally reconciling with his father. Then, again in Metropolis, Dirk Armstrong discuss with Ashbury about her grades and drive her and Scorn home. Shortly after returning to Metropolis Scorn vanished only leaving a note in his undecipherable alien language. He has not reappeared since.

References

Characters created by Dan Jurgens
Comics characters introduced in 1997
DC Comics characters with superhuman strength